Gaetano de Lai (26 July 1853 – 24 October 1928) was an Italian cardinal of the Roman Catholic Church. He was part of the Roman Curia. He was an outspoken defender of the French monarchist Action française.

Biography
De Lai was born in Malo, Vicenza. He was made cardinal in 1907 by Pope Pius X, who also, four years later, consecrated him as titular bishop of Sabina in 1911.

He took part in the 1914 conclave which elected Pope Benedict XV, and the 1922 conclave which chose Pope Pius XI.

He died in Rome.

References

External links

20th-century Italian titular bishops
20th-century Italian cardinals
Cardinal-bishops of Sabina
1853 births
1928 deaths
Pontifical Roman Seminary alumni
Members of the Sacred Consistorial Congregation
Cardinals created by Pope Pius X